Trey Allen Galloway (born November 28, 2001) is an American college basketball player for the Indiana Hoosiers of the Big Ten Conference. He previously played for Culver Academies and was ranked as one of the Class of 2020's highest prospects in the state of Indiana (5th).

High school career
Galloway attended Culver Academies and was coached by his father, Mark Galloway. As a freshman, Galloway averaged 10.2 points, 3.5 rebounds, and 2.3 assists. By the time he was a senior, his stats ballooned to 20.9 points, 5.5 rebounds, and 5.2 assists. Along the way, a sophomore Galloway helped lead his team to a Class 3A state championship title. The next season, Culver Academies made a return trip to the finals; however, the team was unable to repeat the accomplishment. During the off-seasons, Galloway played in the AAU circuit on team Indiana Elite. There he was able to build a relationship with future IU teammates, Anthony Leal and Khristian Lander.

Recruiting
Galloway was recruited in high school by numerous high profile schools, including scholarship offers from in-state schools Indiana, Purdue, Butler, Notre Dame and out-of-state, Big Ten schools Iowa, Michigan State, and Nebraska, among others. On July 26, 2019, Galloway announced his commitment to Indiana.

Career statistics

College

|-
| style="text-align:left;"| 2020–21
| style="text-align:left;"| Indiana
| 25 || 7 || 19.6 || .417 || .182 || .737 || 1.9 || 1.6 || .4 || .0 || 3.6
|-
| style="text-align:left;"| 2021–22
| style="text-align:left;"| Indiana
| 20 || 3 || 20.8 || .464 || .214 || .650 || 1.7 || 1.8 || .9 || .3 || 5.5
|-
| style="text-align:left;"| Career
| style="text-align:left;"| 
| 45 || 10 || 20.1 || .442 || .197 || .692 || 1.8 || 1.7 || .6 || .1 || 4.4

Personal life
Galloway is the son of Mark and Dawn Galloway. His father is a former head basketball coach of Carmel High School and the current head basketball coach of Culver Academies. Galloway stated about his relationship with his dad/coach, “No, we’re not very good about leaving it in the gym. We should be, but we’re not. If I have a bad practice, or things go wrong at practice and he’s mad, it tends to last for a couple of hours a few times, and it can get a little heated." Galloway also has an older brother, Zachary, who has autism. Zachary is high-functioning, but Dawn had this to say about her sons, "Zachary’s not really able to show emotion a lot, so their relationship can be a little different. They were closer when Trey was little, but when he started playing basketball, it was hard for Zachary because he couldn’t play. But they love each other, and they’re always there for each other."

References

External links
Indiana Hoosiers bio

2001 births
Living people
American men's basketball players
Basketball players from Indiana
Indiana Hoosiers men's basketball players
People from Carmel, Indiana
Shooting guards